Abdallah Al Faris Company for Heavy Industries is one of the main suppliers of arms to the Saudi Arabian Army. It has created the Al-Fahd and the Al-Faris 8-400.

References 

Defence companies of Saudi Arabia
Science and technology in Saudi Arabia
Scientific organisations based in Saudi Arabia
Military equipment of Saudi Arabia